Edward Harley, 5th Earl of Oxford and Earl Mortimer (20 February 1773 – 28 December 1848) was an English nobleman.

Harley was the son of John Harley (dean of Windsor) and Roach Vaughan.  Edward succeeded to the titles and estates (including the Harley family seat at Brampton Bryan) of his father's elder brother Edward Harley, 4th Earl of Oxford and Earl Mortimer on the 4th Earl's death without issue in 1790.

In 1803 Henry Bickersteth became the Earl's medical attendant whilst the Earl was on a tour of Italy, staying with him until 1805. Edward became Bickersteth's friend and patron and in 1835 Bickersteth married the earl's eldest daughter. In 1804 Edward sold the Ewyas Lacy tithes by auction. He commissioned work from the architect Robert Smirke.

Family

He and his wife Jane Elizabeth Scott (a notable mistress of Lord Byron) married 3 March 1794 and had eight children, including the following:

Lady Jane Elizabeth Harley (2 March 1796 – Innsbruck 1 September 1872), married 17 August 1835 Henry Bickersteth, 1st Baron Langdale.
Edward Harley, Lord Harley (20 January 1800 – 1 January 1828)
Lady Charlotte Mary Harley (12 December 1801 – 9 May 1880), married 4 March 1823 Anthony Bacon
Lady Anne Harley (31 July 1803 - Florence, 18 May 1874)  married in 1836 Signor Giovanni Battista Rabitti, Cavaliere San Giorgio (3 November 1797 - 5 November 1844, leaving her a widow with three children)
Lady Frances Harley (26 January 1805 – 15 October 1872)  married 20 April 1835  Lt.-Col. Henry Venables Vernon Harcourt (1791 - 26 February 1853), the son of the Archbishop of York
Alfred Harley, 6th Earl of Oxford and Earl Mortimer (10 January 1809 – 19 January 1853)
Hon. Mortimer (17 December 1811 – 3 April 1812)
Lady Louisa, died young.

Due to his wife's infidelity, doubts were expressed about the paternity of many of the children, who were unkindly referred to as "the Harleian Miscellany."

The earl died on 28 December 1848 at his seat at Brampton Bryan Hall.

Notes

1773 births
1848 deaths
Earls in the Peerage of Great Britain
Edward